Wilczyn may refer to the following places in Poland:
Wilczyn, Polkowice County in Lower Silesian Voivodeship (south-west Poland)
Wilczyn, Lublin Voivodeship (east Poland)
Wilczyn, Greater Poland Voivodeship (west-central Poland)